Neale Gordon Marmon (born 21 April 1961) is an English former footballer who spent the majority of his career in Germany. He was most recently interim manager of Yeovil Town.

Marmon, son of an officer in the British Army, grew up partly in Germany. Apart from football, Marmon also won a state swimming championship in Lower Saxony, and was an outstanding basketballer. He became the central figure of FC Homburg's shock 4–2 away cup win over Bayern Munich in August 1991.

Career 
Marmon spent his early football years at Plymouth Argyle and Torquay United, making four appearances for the later in the 1979–80 season. In 1982, he joined SC Rinteln and, the following year, TuS Hessisch-Oldendorf, two amateur clubs from the German state of Lower Saxony. With Hessisch-Oldendorf, he played in the third division Oberliga Nord for a season before joining VfL Osnabrück in the same league.

He began his professional football career in Germany with VfL Osnabrück in the 2. Bundesliga in 1985, having won the Oberliga championship the previous year. After five seasons with the club, he was transferred to Hannover 96 for the sum of DM 150,000. He played with the Hanover club for half a season in the 2. Bundesliga but fell out with manager Slobodan Cendic and moved to his country of birth, joining Colchester United in January 1990 to play in the Fourth Division. Despite having only spend half a season with the club, he became Colchester's player of the year in 1990.

Colchester was relegated to non-league football at the end of the 1989–90 season and Marmon remained with the club to see the side finish runners-up in the Football Conference.

Marmon returned to Germany in 1991, spending a further two seasons in the German second division, now with FC 08 Homburg. He became the hero of the club's 4–2 extra time DFB-Pokal victory over Bayern Munich in Munich on 17 August 1991, when he successfully neutralised Bayern's forwards. Dropping out of fully professional football, he remained in south-western Germany and spent time with third division sides FSV Salmrohr and, later, SV Elversberg, first becoming player-manager and later manager with the club. Marmon coached Elversberg from December 1996 to April 2001, when he was dismissed, followed by a short spell at SC Preußen Münster in 2002. He had two more spells with local German southwest amateur clubs as player and manager following his time in Münster.

In 2011, he became coach of local amateur side SG Schwemlingen/Tünsdorf/Ballern.

In 2019, Marmon was brought in to support manager Darren Way at League Two club Yeovil Town and following his sacking in March he was installed as caretaker manager. On 8 May 2019, with the collapse of the takeover of the club following Yeovil's relegation to the National League, Marmon left the club with immediate effect.

Personal life 
Post full-time football, Marmon, worked for a sports article manufacturer, living alternately in London and Merzig, Germany. He got married in 2007.

By profession, he is a qualified sports teacher as well as a physical therapist.

Career statistics

Managerial

Honours
Colchester United
 Football Conference runner-up: 1990–91

References

External links 
 Neale Marmon at Colchester United Archive Database
 
 

1961 births
Living people
Footballers from Bournemouth
English footballers
British expatriates in Germany
Association football defenders
English Football League players
National League (English football) players
2. Bundesliga players
Torquay United F.C. players
VfL Osnabrück players
Hannover 96 players
Colchester United F.C. players
FC 08 Homburg players
FSV Salmrohr players
SV Elversberg players
SC Preußen Münster managers
Yeovil Town F.C. non-playing staff
Yeovil Town F.C. managers
English football managers